"Genius" is the debut single by pop music supergroup LSD, released on 3 May 2018. It is from the group's 2019 debut studio album, LSD. The song was written by Sia, Labrinth, Diplo and Jr Blender, and produced by the last three with Gustave Rudman. The single was accompanied with a "psychedelic" animated music video directed by Ben Jones and art by Gabriel Alcala. The song impacted the US alternative radios on 19 June 2018. A remixed version of "Genius" featuring American rapper Lil Wayne was released in January 2019.

The song is featured in the video game FIFA 19, by EA Sports.

Composition
Stereogum said the song has an "eclectic, loosely Caribbean production". Dancing Astronaut described the song as "Labrinth and Sia swapping syncopated versework over a characteristically catchy hip-hop lite Diplo beat." Rolling Stone called it "a distinctly Diplo synth-pop drop". Lyrically, the song references Albert Einstein, Galileo Galilei, Stephen Hawking, and Isaac Newton.

Music video
Produced by the company Bento Box Entertainment, illustrated by Gabriel Alcala and directed by Ben Jones (creator of The Problem Solverz and Stone Quackers), "Genius" is a surreal animated cartoon, influences from an American Pop Artist, Peter Max and Heinz Edelmann, who designed for the Beatles's animated musical film, Yellow Submarine. Characters are 2D, boldly colored caricatures of LSD members and anthropomorphic animals. Historical geniuses such as Steve Jobs and Leonardo da Vinci are also referenced, depicted as humanoid mice (mice being a recurring motif in LSD animations). The scenes follow a psychedelic, non-chronological storyline lightly tied to the lyrics, and symbolic animals such as three-eyed tigers and human-like mice are present throughout the video.

Track listing
Digital download – Banx & Ranx Remixes
"Genius" (Banx & Ranx Remix) – 2:57
"Genius" (Banx & Ranx Reggae Remix) – 3:14

Digital download
"Genius" (Lil Wayne Remix) (featuring Lil Wayne) – 2:42

Personnel
Credits adapted from Tidal.
 Diplo – production, programming
 Labrinth – production, engineering, programming
 Jr Blender – production, programming
 Gustave Rudman – production
 Manny Marroquin – mix engineering
 Chris Galland – mix engineering
 Randy Merrill – master engineering
 Bart Schoudel – engineering
 Luke Dimond – engineering
 Robin Florent – engineering assistance
 Scott Desmarais – engineering assistance

Charts

Certifications

Lil Wayne remix

"Genius (Lil Wayne Remix)", featuring American rapper Lil Wayne, was the first official remix of "Genius". It was released on January 17, 2019 by Columbia Records and featured on LSD's debut studio album, LSD (2019).

Music video
On January 17, 2019 the official music video of "Genius" (Lil Wayne Remix) was released on the official Vevo channel of the group.

Remix personnel
Credits adapted from Tidal.
 Lil Wayne – guest vocals, lyrics
 Sia Furler – lyrics, composition
 Timothy McKenzie – composition
 Philip Meckseper – composition
 Diplo – production, programming, composition
 Labrinth – production, engineering, programming
 Jr Blender – production, programming
 Gustave Rudman – miscellaneous production
 Manny Galvez – recording engineering
 John Hanes – mix engineering
 Serban Ghenea – mix engineering
 Randy Merrill – master engineering
 Bart Schoudel – engineering
 Luke Dimond – engineering
 Robin Florent – engineering assistance
 Scott Desmarais – engineering assistance

See also
 Diplo discography
 Labrinth discography
 Sia discography

References

2018 songs
2018 debut singles
Columbia Records singles
LSD (group) songs
Song recordings produced by Diplo
Song recordings produced by Labrinth
Songs written by Diplo
Songs written by Jr Blender
Songs written by Labrinth
Songs written by Sia (musician)
Animated music videos
Number-one singles in Israel